Pakistan is the world's 10th largest producer of rice. Pakistan's exports make up more than 8% of world's total rice trade. It is an important crop in the agriculture economy of Pakistan. Rice is an important Kharif crop.

In 2019, Pakistan produced 7.5 million tonnes of rice and ranked 10th in largest rice producing countries. In 2016/17, Pakistan produced 6.7 million tonnes, of which around 4 million were exported, mainly to neighbouring countries, the Middle East and Africa. Rice is grown in fertile lands of Punjab, Sindh and Balochistan region where millions of farmers rely on rice cultivation as their major source of employment. Among the most famous varieties grown in Pakistan include the Basmati, known for its flavour and quality. Pakistan is a major producer of this variety.

References

 
Agriculture in Pakistan